Scenes from a Mall is a 1991 American comedy film directed by Paul Mazursky, written by Mazursky and Roger L. Simon, and starring Bette Midler and Woody Allen. The title is a play on Ingmar Bergman's Scenes from a Marriage, and the film itself features similar themes of marital disintegration.

The film received mostly negative reviews, with critics focusing on the characters' arbitrary and unrealistic emotional reactions, the lack of successful humor, and the overdone production.

Plot
Nick (Woody Allen), a sports lawyer, is married to psychotherapist and author Deborah (Bette Midler). After years of being happily married, Nick reveals to Deborah that he has had an affair. She is soon shocked and requests a divorce, but later admits that she herself has been unfaithful.

Cast
Bette Midler – Deborah Fifer
Woody Allen – Nick Fifer
Bill Irwin – Mime
Daren Firestone – Sam
Rebecca Nickels – Jennifer
Paul Mazursky – Doctor Hans Clava
Marc Shaiman – Pianist
Joan Delaney – Woman interviewer
Fabio Lanzoni – Handsome Man
Dealin LaValley – Waiter

Production
Most of the mall scenes were filmed at the Kaufman Astoria Studios sound stages in Queens, New York. Mall scenes with elevators and escalators were filmed at the Stamford Town Center in Stamford, Connecticut. Mall exteriors were filmed at the Beverly Center in Los Angeles, California, the mall where most of the picture is set.

Reception
The film received mostly negative reviews, and rated at 32% on Rotten Tomatoes from an aggregate of 25 reviews. At the time of its release, film critics almost unanimously commented that the characters' emotional responses were contrived and false, and that the gaudy set design and production seemed an obvious effort to hide the film's lack of both comedic value and dramatic substance. Roger Ebert summarized the story as "a fog of arbitrary storytelling and desperate gimmicks, sudden revelations and unmotivated mood swings, in a movie that seems to have been written without having been thought about very much." The Los Angeles Times Peter Rainder opined that "the pairing of Allen and Midler, which might seem like the kind of weirdo match-up that could produce a comedy classic, never takes flight. ... Allen and Midler are such highly individual actors that they never quite seem to be in the same orbit; the series of juicy marital revelations that keep perking the movie come across as forced and schematic because we never really believe in the relationship." Variety similarly said that the characters' "emotional storms never achieve any veracity. They seem like just another indulgence on the part of the pampered, secure spouses."

Many critics found the film's awfulness to be especially startling in light of its esteemed director and lead actors. Time Out, for example, said it "comes over as a piss-take of Mazursky by Mazursky." However, most commented that Allen and Midler's performances were not to blame, as there was simply no way to play the characters that would have made them likable or believable. Vincent Canby of The New York Times, one of the few to give the film a positive recommendation, instead argued that Allen and Midler saved the thin and unstructured script: "Little by little, though, the stars take over their characters. They play together with a straight-on honesty that is funny because of the oddball situations, and moving for the unexpected, easy legitimacy of the performances."

Scenes from a Mall was amongst Siskel & Ebert's worst movies of 1991. Gene Siskel, who chose the film for the list with Ebert approving the choice, remarked, "Bette Midler and Woody Allen in the same film as a married couple? Well, the very idea of that is funnier than anything in the movie!"

Box office

The film was not a box office success but did manage to bring back its budget.

References

External links

 
 
 

1991 films
1991 comedy films
Adultery in films
American comedy films
American satirical films
Films about marriage
Films directed by Paul Mazursky
Films scored by Marc Shaiman
Films set in shopping malls
Films shot at Astoria Studios
Films shot in Connecticut
Touchstone Pictures films
1990s English-language films
1990s American films